Diego Hernán Romero (born June 13, 1988 in Río Grande, Argentina) is an Argentine footballer currently playing as a forward for Deportes Concepción of the Primera División B in Chile.

Teams
  C.A.I. 2007–2011
  Patronato de Paraná 2011–2012
  Olimpo de Bahía Blanca 2012–2013
  Deportes Concepción 2013–present

External links
 
 

1988 births
Living people
Argentine footballers
Argentine expatriate footballers
Comisión de Actividades Infantiles footballers
Olimpo footballers
Club Atlético Patronato footballers
Deportes Concepción (Chile) footballers
Primera B de Chile players
Expatriate footballers in Chile
Argentine expatriate sportspeople in Chile
People from Río Grande, Tierra del Fuego
Association football midfielders